(+)-Germacrene D synthase (EC 4.2.3.77) is an enzyme with systematic name (2E,6E)-farnesyl-diphosphate diphosphate-lyase ((+)-germacrene-D-forming). This enzyme catalyses the following chemical reaction

 (2E,6E)-farnesyl diphosphate  (+)-germacrene D + diphosphate

This enzyme requires Mg2+, Mn2+, Ni2+ or Co2+.

References

External links 
 

EC 4.2.3